Stade municipal Lawandidi is a multi-use stadium in Zinder, Niger.  It is currently used mostly for football matches and traditional wrestling, and serves as the home venue for Espoir FC.  The stadium holds 10,000 people.

References 

Football venues in Niger
Zinder